Jonas Erikson Sundahl (1678-1762) was a Swedish-born architect who spent most of his working life at and around Zweibrücken in the German Palatinate. Most of his designs were in the then-modern Baroque style.

Biography
Sundahl's exact date of birth is uncertain. His father was Olaf Erikson Sundahl (1627-1697), a ship's captain. He had two brothers, Mons Erikson and Olaf.

In 1689 - at the age of 11 - he matriculated at Uppsala University. In 1693, his uncle, Brynolph Hesselgreen, called him to Pomerania. In 1698, he was appointed Landmesser (surveyor) in Halland and South Sweden.

The then king of Sweden, Charles XII, was also Duke of Palatinate-Zweibrücken in Germany. In 1702, Charles' governor in Zweibrücken, asked for the services of an architect. Sundahl relocated to the Palatinate, where he stayed for the rest of his life. His earliest known work dates from that yearimprovements to the fortifications of Zweibrücken.

Oxenstierna died in 1707. Charles presumably appointed another governor in his place.

Charles has a warlike reputation. In 1702, he invaded Poland. In 1704, he deposed its king, Augustus II, and installed Stanisław Leszczyński in his place as a client king. In 1709, Stanisław was overthrown by Augustus, was expelled from Poland, and sought refuge in Sweden. In 1714, Stanisław relocated to Zweibrücken, where he remained until 1718.

Charles died in 1718. His cousin Gustav (1670-1731) inherited the title of Duke of Zweibrücken. Stanisław left Zweibrücken. It seems that the existing accommodation at Zweibrücken was not to Gustav's liking, because Sundahl spent 1720-1725 designing and building for him Zweibrücken Castle, perhaps his greatest achievement. From 1720 to 1725, Sundahl seems to have been chief architect to the court of Zweibrücken. From 1724 or 1725 to 1731 (sources differ for the beginning date), he was subordinated to Charles François Duchesnois. In 1731, he was reinstated to his earlier position. He was thereafter again chief architect at Zweibrücken, and was promoted to the rank of chamberlain. In 1755, he resigned from his post (he was in his seventies), and was succeeded by his pupil and assistant  (1726-1806).

Personal life
On 11 November 1705, Sundahl married Anna Dorothea von Bein (1680-1726), of a patrician family of Frankfurt am Main. They had 13 children, most of whom died young. Their third son, Johann Gottfried Christian, may have been a surveyor in Blieskastel and in the area around Kaiserslautern. On 26 July 1732, Sundahl married Katharina Sophia  Heinztensberger, a widow. There were three children from that second marriage. Sundahl died on 5 June 1762, in Zweibrücken.

Works
Sundahl has been said to have been influenced by the ideas of Swedish architect Nicodemus Tessin the Younger (1654-1728).

Sundahl's works include:
 1702improvements to the fortifications of Zweibrücken
 1714, 1719, Mandelbachtal, improvements to the buildings and to the abbey church
 1717Schloss Ditschviller, Cocheren
 1720, a residence in Jägersburg, Homburg, for Gustav, Duke of Zweibrücken
 1720-1725Zweibrücken Castle, a ducal palace for Gustav, Duke of Zweibrücken
 1720-1730Hof- and Bergskirche Lutheran churches in Bad Bergzabern
 1723, Herschweiler-Pettersheim, a hunting lodge for Gustav, Duke of Zweibrücken
 1723a church in Niederkirchen
 1723a church in Rathskirchen
 1723the Schwedenhof in Einöd for Gustav, Duke of Zweibrücken
 1723Bergzabern Palace for Gustav, Duke of Zweibrücken
 1725-1731, Homburg, for Gustav, Duke of Zweibrücken
 1747the library at Zweibrücken Castle
 1750-1756Evangelical Church in Birkenfeld (with ) 
 1755Schloss Blieskastel, Blieskastel
 1755Zwinglikirche, a church in

Gallery

Notes

References

Other sources
  By .
  By .

1678 births
1762 deaths
People from Dalsland
People from Zweibrücken
18th-century Swedish architects